Acton Vale station is a former railway station in Acton Vale, Quebec, Canada. The station was built in 1900 by the Grand Trunk Railway and is located at 960 Boulay Street.

It was recognized as a National Historic Site of Canada on June 11, 1976. Today it operates as a town tourism office and exhibition centre.

References

External links

Acton Vale Station at the Historical Marker Database
Station d'art de la vieille gare

Disused railway stations in Canada
Grand Trunk Railway stations in Quebec
Railway stations in Canada opened in 1900
National Historic Sites in Quebec
Railway stations in Montérégie
Acton Regional County Municipality
Railway stations closed in 1994